Hassocks railway station is on the Brighton Main Line in England, serving the village of Hassocks, West Sussex. It is managed by Southern.

Trains calling at Hassocks are operated by Southern and Thameslink.

History 

The station was named "Hassocks Gate" upon its opening on 21 September 1841 by the London and Brighton Railway, which became the London Brighton and South Coast Railway in 1846. It was one of the few intermediate stations on the line with four tracks, to allow express trains to overtake those stopping at the station. However, the number of tracks was later reduced to two, although the additional width is still apparent from the siting of the station buildings.

The original 1841 station building was designed by David Mocatta, the architect of the railway, in a simple cottage style, but using the same modular system that he applied to other stations on the line.

For many years Hassocks Gate station was used by excursion trains for passengers visiting the nearby South Downs and suffered as a result as it became a meeting place for prostitutes. It stands almost at the summit of the line's climb from London before passing through Clayton Tunnel, a short distance south of the station. This was the site of the Clayton Tunnel rail crash in 1861, resulting in 23 deaths and 176 injuries.

Between December 1880 and August 1881 a new station building was constructed by James Longley & Co of Crawley to the designs of Thomas Myres as the prototype for those later built in the same style on the Bluebell and Cuckoo line with a half-timbered upper storey, decorative brick eaves, stained glass windows and charming porches. The booking office was covered by a lantern-shaped roof and the platforms by wooden canopies on iron columns. The station was demolished in 1973 by British Rail and replaced with a CLASP structure which was described as "truly awful".

In 2006 the local community announced that it was hoping to raise £2.5m to rebuild the station to the previous design. Although these plans fell through, in 2008 Network Rail announced that it would be carrying out an 18-month feasibility study to identify possible improvements to the existing building in order to facilitate access by the disabled and elderly. Limited modifications were made to the station in 2011 with the addition of ticket gate lines on both platforms and some refurbishment of the shelters. In January 2011 it was announced by Network Rail that £1.25 million would be used to rebuild the station under the Department for Transport's National Station Improvement Programme and that a further £1.6 million, from the Access for All scheme, used to install step-free access.

Work began on building the new station in November 2012 and the new ticket office opened for the first time on 14 June 2013. At this point there was still work to be completed including the installation of lifts to improve access to the subway however the opening of the new station officially took place on Friday 5 July 2013, conducted by the MD of Southern and Catherine Cassidy. Work was completed by December 2013.

The station features in Sabine Baring-Gould's mid-Victorian ghost story The 9.30 Up-train.

Woodside level crossing, to the north of the station, was closed in 2021 due to safety concerns. In June 2022, an underpass was opened which replaced the level crossing.

Services 
Off-peak, services at Hassocks are operated by Southern and Thameslink using  and  EMUs.

The typical off-peak service in trains per hour is:
 2 tph to  via 
 2 tph to 
 2 tph to 
 2 tph to  via 

During the peak hours and on Saturdays, the service between London Victoria and Littlehampton is increased to 2 tph.

In addition, the station is served by a number of peak hour Gatwick Express services which usually pass through Hassocks.

References

External links 

Mid Sussex District
Railway stations in West Sussex
DfT Category C2 stations
Former London, Brighton and South Coast Railway stations
Railway stations in Great Britain opened in 1841
Railway stations served by Govia Thameslink Railway
Thomas Myres buildings
David Mocatta railway stations